Aglossa signicostalis is a species of snout moth in the genus Aglossa. It was first described by Staudinger, in 1871, and is known from Israel, Italy, the Czech Republic, Slovakia, Hungary, Romania, Bulgaria, North Macedonia and Greece.

The wingspan is about 19 mm.

References

Moths described in 1871
Pyralini
Moths of Europe
Moths of the Middle East